This is a list of Belgian football transfers for the 2014 summer transfer window. Only transfers involving a team from the Belgian Pro League are listed.

The summer transfer window will open on 1 July 2014, although some transfers were announced prior to that date. Players without a club may join one at any time, either during or in between transfer windows. The transfer window ends on 1 September 2014, although a few completed transfers could still be announced a few days later.

Sorted by date

January 2014

February 2014

March 2014

April 2014

May 2014

End of 2013–14 season
After the end of the 2013–14 season, several players will return from loan to another club or will not have their contracts extended. These will be listed here when the date is otherwise not specified.

June 2014

July 2014

August 2014

September 2014

Sorted by team

Anderlecht

In:

Out:

Cercle Brugge

In:

Out:

Charleroi

In:

Out:

Club Brugge

In:

Out:

Genk

In:

Out:

Gent

In:

 

Out:

Kortrijk

In:

Out:

Lierse

In:

Out:

Lokeren

In:

Out:

Mechelen

In:

Out:

Mouscron-Péruwelz

In:

Out:

Oostende

In:

Out:

Standard Liège

In:

Out:

Waasland-Beveren

In:

Out:

Westerlo

In:

 Gent

Out:

Zulte Waregem

In:

Out:

Footnotes

References

Belgian
Transfers Summer
2014 Summer